Lensman or the Lensman series is a science fiction book series by Edward Elmer Smith
 First Lensman, the second novel of the series, published in 1950
 Gray Lensman, the fourth book in the series, published in 1951
 Second Stage Lensmen, originally published in four parts, November 1941 – February 1942

Lensman may also refer to:

 Lensman (1984 film), an anime movie based on the Lensman novels
 Galactic Patrol Lensman, an anime television series based on the Lensman novels
 "Backstage Lensman", a short story parody of the Lensman series by Randall Garrett, first written in 1949
 Lensman microscope, designed by Rick Dickinson
 Lensman (game), a game based on the Lensman novels